Ravno is a South Slavic toponym, meaning "flat". It may refer to:

 Ravno, a village and a municipality in Bosnia and Herzegovina
 Ravno, Dobje, a village in Slovenia
 Ravno, Krško, a village in Slovenia

Serbo-Croatian toponyms
Serbo-Croatian place names